Nav Prabhat is an Indian politician from Uttarakhand and a two term Member of the Uttarakhand Legislative Assembly. Nav Prabhat twice (2002-07 & 2012-17) represents the Vikasnagar (Uttarakhand Assembly constituency). Nav Prabhat is a member of the Indian National Congress.

Positions held

Elections contested

References

Living people
Uttarakhand MLAs 2002–2007
Indian National Congress politicians from Uttarakhand
Politicians from Dehradun
All India Indira Congress (Tiwari) politicians
Uttarakhand MLAs 2012–2017
Year of birth missing (living people)